Charles Curtis Ridley (September 24, 1951 – December 19, 2021) was a Canadian ice hockey goaltender. He played in the National Hockey League between 1974 and 1981.

Ridley was born in Minnedosa, Manitoba, and raised in Portage la Prairie. He played 104 games in the National Hockey League with the New York Rangers, Vancouver Canucks, and Toronto Maple Leafs. Drafted in the second round of the 1971 NHL Amateur Draft, Ridley, then a player of the Portage Terriers of the Manitoba Junior Hockey League, became the first player to ever be drafted directly from Tier II Junior A (now Junior A). 

He was inducted to the Manitoba Hockey Hall of Fame in 2015.

After finishing his playing career, Ridley lived in Winnipeg, and sold telephone systems and wireless communications. He later moved to Dallas. Curt Ridley died on December 19, 2021, at the age of 70.

Career statistics

Regular season and playoffs

Awards and achievements
MJHL First All-Star Team (1971)

References

External links

1951 births
2021 deaths
Boston Braves (AHL) players
Boston Bruins draft picks
Brandon Wheat Kings players
Canadian expatriate ice hockey players in the United States
Canadian ice hockey goaltenders
Cincinnati Tigers players
Dallas Black Hawks players
Dayton Gems players
Ice hockey people from Manitoba
New Brunswick Hawks players
New York Rangers players
Oklahoma City Blazers (1965–1977) players
People from Minnedosa, Manitoba
Providence Reds players
Portage Terriers players
Sportspeople from Portage la Prairie
Toronto Maple Leafs players
Tulsa Oilers (1964–1984) players
Vancouver Canucks players